Indiana Jones and the Dial of Destiny is an upcoming American action-adventure film directed by James Mangold, who co-wrote the script with Jez Butterworth, John-Henry Butterworth, and David Koepp. Produced by Lucasfilm and distributed by Walt Disney Studios Motion Pictures, it is the fifth installment of the Indiana Jones film series. The film stars Harrison Ford in his fifth and final portrayal of archaeologist Indiana Jones. John Rhys-Davies reprises his role as Sallah from past films, with new cast members including Phoebe Waller-Bridge, Antonio Banderas, Shaunette Renée Wilson, Thomas Kretschmann, Toby Jones, Boyd Holbrook, Olivier Richters, Ethann Isidore, and Mads Mikkelsen.

Dial of Destiny is the first film in the series not directed by Steven Spielberg nor with a story written by George Lucas, with Spielberg and Lucas serving as executive producers instead. It is also the first film in the series not to have the involvement of Paramount Pictures, as The Walt Disney Company acquired Lucasfilm in 2012. 

Plans for a fifth Indiana Jones film harken back to the late 1970s when Lucas and Spielberg negotiated with Paramount for four sequels to Raiders of the Lost Ark (1981). Lucas began researching potential plot devices for a fifth film in 2008, although the project stalled for years. He passed the project to producer Kathleen Kennedy in 2012, when she became the president of Lucasfilm. Progress on a fifth film remained dormant while the company worked on the Star Wars sequel trilogy. Koepp was eventually hired to write the fifth film in 2016, with a release date set for 2019, although this was delayed several times due to rewrites. In 2018, Jonathan Kasdan was hired to replace Koepp, who returned to write in 2019 before eventually leaving the film. Spielberg was to direct, but stepped down in 2020, with Mangold taking his place. Filming began in June 2021 and concluded in February 2022. Shooting locations include various locations in the United Kingdom in England and Scotland, Italy, and Morocco.

Indiana Jones and the Dial of Destiny is scheduled for release theatrically in the United States on June 30, 2023.

Premise 
In 1969, American archaeologist and adventurer Indiana Jones lives against the backdrop of the Space Race. Jones is uneasy over the fact that the U.S. government has recruited former Nazis to help beat the Soviet Union in the competition to make it to space. His goddaughter, Helena Shaw, accompanies him on his journey. Meanwhile, Jürgen Voller, a NASA member and ex-Nazi involved with the moon-landing program, wishes to make the world into a better place as he sees fit.

Cast 
 Harrison Ford as Indiana Jones, the world-renowned globe-trotting archaeologist and college professor. Mangold considers Jones as "a phenomenally unique hero" and a "brilliant nerd who is also a badass".
 Phoebe Waller-Bridge as Helena Shaw, Jones' goddaughter. Mangold identifies Helena as the "catalyst" of the film, kicking off the film's plot after dragging her godfather into a problem of hers. She is also the daughter of an old friend of Indy who hasn't been shown before.
 Mads Mikkelsen as Jürgen Voller, a former Nazi during World War II who has been hired by NASA and seeks to use the Apollo moon landing program for his own gain.
 Antonio Banderas as Renaldo, a friend of Indy.
 John Rhys-Davies as Sallah, Jones' old friend who aided in finding the Ark of the Covenant in 1936 and the Holy Grail in 1938.
 Shaunette Renée Wilson as Mason, a government agent.
 Thomas Kretschmann as Colonel Weber, a Nazi working with Voller in 1944.
 Toby Jones as Basil, an ally of Jones.
 Boyd Holbrook as Klaber, Voller's nefarious right-hand man in 1969.

Additionally, Olivier Richters and Ethann Isidore are cast in undisclosed roles.

Production

Development 
In 1979, George Lucas and Steven Spielberg made a deal with Paramount Pictures for five Indiana Jones films. In April 2008, Harrison Ford said he would return as Indiana Jones for a fifth film if it does not take another twenty years to develop, referring to the long development of Indiana Jones and the Kingdom of the Crystal Skull (2008), which was released a month later. The film introduced the character Mutt Williams, played by Shia LaBeouf. Producer Lucas suggested an idea to make Williams the lead character in a fifth film, but later decided against this. Lucas said that Ford's age would not be an issue in making another film, saying "it's not like he's an old man. He's incredibly agile; he looks even better than he did 20 years ago".

Lucas began researching potential plot devices for another film in 2008, and stated that Spielberg was open to directing it, as he had done for the previous films. Explaining the process for each film, Ford said, "We come to some basic agreement and then George goes away for a long time and works on it. Then Steven and I get it in some form, some embryonic form. Then if we like it we start working with George on it and at some point down the line it's ready and we do it." Lucas stressed the importance of having a MacGuffin that is supernatural but still grounded in reality with an archaeological or historical background, saying "you can't just make something up, like a time machine". Speaking about the previous film and the franchise's future, Lucas said "we still have the issues about the direction we'd like to take. I'm in the future; Steven's in the past. He's trying to drag it back to the way they were, I'm trying to push it to a whole different place. So, still we have a sort of tension". Later in 2008, Ford stated that Lucas' concept for the fifth film was "crazy but great". In November 2010, Ford said that Lucas was still working on the project. In July 2012, producer Frank Marshall stated that the project had no writer and said about its progress, "I don't know if it's definitely not happening, but it's not up and running".

In October 2012, The Walt Disney Company acquired Lucasfilm, giving the parent company ownership rights to the Indiana Jones intellectual property. In December 2013, Walt Disney Studios purchased the distribution and marketing rights to future Indiana Jones films from Paramount Pictures, with Paramount receiving financial participation compensation for all future films. With the 2012 sale, Lucas passed Indiana Jones 5 to new Lucasfilm president Kathleen Kennedy. Lucasfilm planned to focus on the Star Wars franchise before working on a fifth Indiana Jones film.

In May 2015, Kennedy confirmed that Lucasfilm would eventually make another Indiana Jones film. Kingdom of the Crystal Skull ended positively for Indiana Jones, with his marriage to Marion Ravenwood. However, Ford did not necessarily view the film as a definitive ending for Jones, wishing to make one more film that could expand the character and conclude his journey. According to Kennedy, "we all felt that if we could conclude the series with one more movie, give the fact that Harrison was so excited to try to do another one, we should do it". Kennedy, Spielberg and Ford had discussed a couple of story ideas by the end of 2015.

Pre-production 
In March 2016, Disney announced that the fifth film would be released on July 19, 2019, with Ford reprising his role. Spielberg would direct the film, with Kennedy and Marshall as producers. Ford was paid $10–12 million for his involvement. In April 2016, Marshall said the film was in early pre-production. A MacGuffin had been chosen for the film, and work on the script began a few months later, with David Koepp as the screenwriter. The story was conceived by Koepp and Spielberg. Koepp had previously written several other Spielberg films, including Kingdom of the Crystal Skull. Spielberg said the title character would not be killed off during the events of the film. Marshall stated that the story would continue from where the previous film ended. It was initially reported that Lucas would not be involved in the project, although Spielberg later said that Lucas would serve as an executive producer: "Of course I would never make an Indiana Jones film without George Lucas. That would be insane." Later that year, it was announced that Lucas would have no involvement, with Marshall stating two years later that "life changes and we're moving on. He moved on".

In 2017, the film's release date was pushed back to 2020, as Spielberg was busy working on Ready Player One (2018) and The Post (2017). Koepp said "we've got a script we're mostly happy with", and confirmed that LaBeouf's character, Mutt Williams, would not appear in the film. Spielberg set Indiana Jones 5 as his next film, with production set to begin in the UK in April 2019. However, filming was pushed back as a final script had yet to be approved. In early 2018, Lucasfilm met with screenwriters Scott Beck and Bryan Woods for an "open canvas talk" including the Indiana Jones and Star Wars franchises. Beck stated that they had considered writing the next Indiana Jones movie, but that ultimately he and Woods were more interested in establishing an original franchise. Marshall said that a lot of people had pitched ideas for the film. Jonathan Kasdan was eventually hired to replace Koepp in mid-2018, and a new release date was set for 2021.

Kasdan had departed the project by May 2019, and it was rumored that writer Dan Fogelman would take over. In September 2019, Koepp announced that he had re-joined the production as writer, stating that the filmmakers had "a good idea this time". Koepp ultimately wrote two versions of the film, but neither were approved. He said that efforts to produce the film had failed because of disagreement between Spielberg, Ford, and Disney regarding the script.

In February 2020, Spielberg stepped down as director, as he wanted to pass the film series to a new filmmaker for a fresh perspective. Kennedy later said that Spielberg "was kind of off and on" about directing the project, although he did remain as a hands-on producer. Filming had been scheduled to begin later in 2020, although the film's release was subsequently delayed to 2022, and eventually 2023.

James Mangold was confirmed as director in May 2020, when he began work on a new script. Ford suggested Spielberg and Kennedy to hire Mangold to take over the directing duties, owing to their already existing friendship due to Mangold offering him a part in Ford v Ferrari (2019) and the two having worked together in The Call of the Wild (2020). Koepp departed the project again after Spielberg stepped down, saying it "seemed like the right time to let Jim have his own take on it and have his own person or himself write it". Mangold wrote the new screenplay with Jez and John-Henry Butterworth, who worked with him previously on Ford v Ferrari. Among the previous films in the series, Mangold cited Raiders of the Lost Ark (1981) as his biggest inspiration while making Dial of Destiny. He consulted with Lucas and Spielberg, who serve as executive producers. Recalling advice that Spielberg offered, Mangold said, "It's a movie that's a trailer from beginning to end — always be moving".

Casting 

Despite Ford's age, Marshall and Spielberg ruled out the possibility of recasting his character. Ford said, "I'm Indiana Jones. When I'm gone, he's gone."

In April 2021, Phoebe Waller-Bridge, Mads Mikkelsen and Thomas Kretschmann were cast in undisclosed roles. Boyd Holbrook and Shaunette Renée Wilson were added the next month. Waller-Bridge described her character as "a mystery and a wonder", and Mangold referred the actress to Barbara Stanwyck's performance as Jean Harrington in The Lady Eve (1941) as a key reference point. Mikkelsen said the script was "everything I wished it to be". His character was partly inspired by Wernher von Braun. Like most villainous characters he has played throughout his career, Mikkelsen describes Voller as a "misunderstood person". Holbrook previously co-starred in Mangold's film Logan (2017).

John Rhys-Davies reprised his role of Sallah for the first time since Indiana Jones and the Last Crusade (1989). Karen Allen was also interested in reprising her role as Marion, noting that she and Jones were married in the previous film "so it would be difficult, I think, to move forward without her". Similarly, despite not hearing anything from Spielberg concerning a potential return for him, Jim Broadbent expressed a willingness to reprise his role as Charles Stanforth from Kingdom of the Crystal Skull. In July 2021, Antonio Banderas was cast in the film, portraying an ally to Indiana Jones. In December 2022, Mangold reaffirmed that LaBeouf would not return as Mutt Williams in the film, but assured that audiences will "find out" what has become of his character in the film.

Filming 
Although Crystal Skull was largely shot in the U.S., Marshall said that the fifth film would return to a global range of filming locations like the earlier films. Mangold was opposed to using the StageCraft virtual production technology developed by Industrial Light & Magic (ILM) for Lucasfilm's The Mandalorian (2019-present), wanting to rely mainly on practical effects. Principal photography began in the UK on June 4, 2021. Shooting locations included Pinewood Studios and Bamburgh Castle. Scenes were also filmed at the North Yorkshire Moors Railway near Grosmont, where an action sequence involving Ford's stunt double was shot and replicas of World War II-era Nazi military vehicles were seen on set. Ford himself was spotted in Grosmont on June 7, 2021. During mid-June, filming took place at the Leaderfoot Viaduct in Scotland, while a motorcycle chase was shot in the Scottish village of Glencoe. Other Scottish locations included Biggar, South Lanarkshire.

Later in June, location shooting moved to London where a street in Hackney was lined with vintage cars. Filming also took place inside a private residence which was reportedly chosen for its period style interior. On June 23, Ford reportedly had injured his shoulder during the rehearsal of a fight scene and it was announced that the production crew would shoot around his recovery. In July, shooting moved to Glasgow's city center, which was transformed to resemble New York City. A chase sequence, shot along St. Vincent Street and other areas, recreates a 1969 ticker tape parade celebrating the return of the Apollo 11 astronauts. A stunt double, Mike Massa, performed in place of Ford throughout the Glasgow shoot, with motion capture markers applied to his face. Holbrook and Waller-Bridge were also on set. Filming in Glasgow lasted two weeks. Ford resumed filming in September 2021, and some shooting took place in the Hatton Garden area of London, which also doubled as New York City.

A month later, production moved to Sicily, Italy. The Italian shoot included nearly 600 crew members. Filming began in the city of Syracuse, with locations such as the Ear of Dionysius cave, the Grotta Dei Cordari cave, the Neapolis archaeological park, and Castello Maniace. Subsequent shooting locations in Sicily included the city of Cefalù and the Province of Trapani. The latter location included filming in the towns of Castellammare del Golfo and Marsala. Ford and Waller-Bridge also filmed at the Temple of Segesta. Some filming in Sicily involved actors dressed as Roman soldiers, which created speculation that the film's storyline involves time travel. Filming began in Fez, Morocco, on October 17, 2021. On November 4, a camera operator named Nic Cupac was found dead in his Morocco hotel room; Disney stated that his death was not production related. Filming was completed on February 26, 2022.

Ford was digitally de-aged for the film's 1944 opening sequence to depict his appearance during the first three Indiana Jones films. The de-aging process used several techniques, including new software from ILM which looked through archived footage of a younger Ford. Ford was somewhat "spooked" by the de-aging process, but was nonetheless impressed. Spielberg had previously rejected the idea of de-aging Ford with motion capture akin to the one he employed in The Adventures of Tintin (2011), saying that he wanted Ford's age to be acknowledged in the film. Phedon Papamichael serves as cinematographer, marking his sixth film with Mangold.

Music 
In June 2016, Spielberg confirmed that John Williams, who scored for the previous films in the Indiana Jones franchise, would return to compose the music for the fifth film. In 2022, Williams stated that it would be his final film score, following plans for a retirement, though he later backtracked on this decision. Williams premiered one of his compositions, "Helena's Theme", at the Hollywood Bowl on September 2, 2022, at Mangold's request.

Themes and influences
Speaking about the film as a finale to the franchise, Mangold said, "It became really important to me to figure out how to make this a movie about a hero at sunset". He said that Jones's age would be a major part of the film, something that was touched upon only briefly in the earlier drafts: "The issues I brought up about Indy's age were not things I thought were being addressed in the material being developed at the time. There were 'old' jokes, but the material itself wasn't about it. To me, whatever your greatest liability, you should fly straight towards that. If you try to pretend it's not there, you end up getting slings and arrows the whole way."

Mangold said of the film's cinematic style that the opening sequence, set in 1944, is meant to contrast with the main plot, which takes place in 1969, allowing the film to start with a blast of classic Indiana Jones action reminiscent of the first three films (1981–1989). The transition from the pulpy cinematic language of 1940s films brings the characters from an "older world" into the "modern" 1960s, a present that essentially started, in terms of technology, with the Cold War, nuclear power, intrigue and black and white morality. Mangold sought to portray "an accurate and realistic appraisal of where this character would be at this time in his life", describing Jones as "a hero who is used to a black and white world" when it comes to villains, who now finds himself in a gray world with a lack of "clear good guys and bad guys". Jez Butterworth noted the presence of ex-Nazis involved in the U.S. government's moon-landing program. This makes Jones grow distrustful of his country, feeling like a man out of time in an era in which idealism is gone.

Mangold compared Dial of Destiny to his finale X-Men film Logan, enjoying the notion of what a hero can do for the world when it no longer has a place for him, allowing classical heroes to be seen through the "prism" of today's "jaundiced contemporary attitudes". However, Dial of Destiny would lack the seriousness of Logan, the latter regarded as a "purposefully and intentionally" grim adventure.

Release 
Indiana Jones and the Dial of Destiny is scheduled to be theatrically released in the United States on June 30, 2023, by Walt Disney Studios Motion Pictures. It was initially set for release on July 19, 2019, taking off the then-planned release date for the Marvel Cinematic Universe unproduced Inhumans film by Marvel Studios, but was delayed in April 2017 to July 10, 2020, with the live-action remake of The Lion King (1994) taking its former spot. It then shifted to July 9, 2021, and was further delayed to July 29, 2022, following the impact of the COVID-19 pandemic on the film industry. Its current release date was announced in October 2021.

Marketing 
During Star Wars Celebration in May 2022, Ford debuted the first official image from the film, showing Jones silhouetted in a cave. Exclusive footage was shown to attendees at the D23 Expo in September 2022. The footage included shots of a de-aged Ford and multiple action sequences, and confirmed the return of Rhys-Davies. The film's title, Indiana Jones and the Dial of Destiny, was revealed on December 1, 2022, alongside the first trailer for the film. Hasbro will produce toys based on the film, as it did with Crystal Skull in 2008. Lego will release sets in conjunction with the release of the film in a relaunch of their Indiana Jones theme. A TV spot for the film aired during Super Bowl LVII on February 12, 2023.

Future 
Disney CEO Bob Iger said in 2016 that the future of the franchise with Ford was unknown, but that the fifth film would not be the final installment in the franchise. In 2022, Kennedy reaffirmed earlier comments that Ford's role as Indiana Jones would not be recast, while Ford confirmed that the fifth film would be his last in the series. As of November 2022, Disney was considering multiple options to continue the franchise, including additional films or television series.

References

External links 
 
 
 

2023 films
2023 action adventure films
2020s American films
2020s English-language films
American action adventure films
American sequel films
Apollo 11
Films about educators
Films about old age
Films about time travel
Films directed by James Mangold
Films postponed due to the COVID-19 pandemic
Films produced by Frank Marshall
Films produced by Kathleen Kennedy
Films produced by Steven Spielberg
Films scored by John Williams
Films set in 1944
Films set in 1969
Films set in New York City
Films shot at Pinewood Studios
Films shot in Glasgow
Films shot in London
Films shot in Northumberland
Films shot in North Yorkshire
Films shot in Scotland
Films shot in Sicily
Films with screenplays by David Koepp
Films with screenplays by James Mangold
Films with screenplays by Jez Butterworth
Indiana Jones films
Lucasfilm films
Midlife crisis films
Treasure hunt films
Upcoming English-language films
Upcoming films
Upcoming sequel films